Azhuthayar is a tributary of the Pamba River, the third longest river in the South Indian state of Kerala. It originates from Peerumedu, flows through dense forests and reaches Koruthodu. From there it forms the boundary between Kottayam and Idukki districts. It then crosses Sabarimala traditional trekking path at Kalaketti area before joining with Pamba river at Kanamala(Pambavalley). Like its parent river, it is also closely related to the legend of Lord Ayyappan, a popular Hindu deity worshipped mainly in Kerala. It flows through a place also named Azhutha (near Kalaketti Temple), which is on the Sabarimala trek  route from Erumeli to Sabarimala. The river Pamba, ultimately flows around  through towns and villages Ranni, Cherukolpuzha, Kozhencherry, Maramon, Aranmula, Chengannur, Parumala, Neerettupuram, Kavalam, Nedumudi and Thakazhy before joining Vembanad lake.

Rivers of Idukki district
Rivers of Kottayam district
Rivers of Pathanamthitta district
Pamba River